This is a list of the 1974 PGA Tour Qualifying School graduates.

After three 72-hole regional qualifiers, there were 78 players in the 144-hole final qualifying tournament. The finals were played over two week in November at Silverado Country Club in Napa, California and Canyon Country Club in Palm Springs, California.

The top 19 players earned their tour card. Fuzzy Zoeller was the medalist. Bob Risch finished runner-up in was his fourth attempt to earn playing privileges. Billy Kratzert attempted to earn his PGA Tour card for the first time. He was not successful.

Sources:

References

PGA Tour Qualifying School
Golf in California
PGA Tour Qualifying School Graduates
PGA Tour Qualifying School Graduates